Jonathan B. Allen (professionally known as MrBallen), is an internet personality and a former United States Navy SEAL. He is best known for his victim-oriented true crime stories and mysteries on YouTube. He co-founded Ballen Studios, and the exclusive rights to his podcast MrBallen Podcast: Strange, Dark and Mysterious Stories were licensed to Amazon Music in September 2022. Allen's work is also distributed through various platforms and media channels, including YouTube, Amazon Music, and TikTok, among others.

Early life 
Allen was born in Quincy, Massachusetts. He graduated from North Quincy High School in 2006. That year, he attended UMass Amherst for one semester before dropping out. He later returned to UMass Amherst and graduated with a bachelor's degree in philosophy in 2010.

Career

Military service 
After graduating from UMass Amherst, Allen visited a recruiting office in Quincy, Massachusetts and enlisted in the military. Allen joined SEAL Team Two in Virginia Beach in 2012. During his service, he was deployed to Afghanistan and South America. In 2014, his team was attacked in Afghanistan and a grenade hit Allen, with shrapnel impacting his hips and legs. He recovered, and in 2017, Allen medically retired from the Navy.

YouTube and TikTok 
Allen launched his YouTube channel in 2020 and began filming true crime and mysteries. He attracts an audience of over 6 million subscribers on the platform. The YouTube channel averages 40 million monthly views. He was noted for his storytelling style that builds suspense throughout his videos.

Allen started experimenting with TikTok the same year he started his Youtube channel in 2020. His first viral video was about nine hikers from the Ural State Technical University who were mysteriously killed in early February 1959, an event known as the Dyatlov Pass incident. The video gained 5 million views the same day it was posted, prompting him to make additional TikToks about other unsolved mysteries.

In October 2022, Allen was nominated for four YouTube Streamy awards, in the creator of the year, breakout creator, and podcast categories. He received the most nominations for a first-time nominee. Additionally, Allen and his nonprofit organization, MrBallen Foundation, was nominated for the creator for social good award.

Podcast 
In February 2022, Allen released MrBallen Podcast: Strange, Dark & Mysterious Stories. The podcast ranked number one on Spotify's True Crime Podcasts chart. As of July 2022, the MrBallen podcast was downloaded over seven million times a month across all podcast platforms.

Ballen Studios 
In 2022, Allen, along with Nick Witters, opened a production company Ballen Studios, with Witters serving as the company's CEO. The studio focuses on scaling existing ventures into new media forms and creating advertising streams. Ballen Studios also signed with the United Talent Agency (UTA).

Amazon Music Partnership 
In October 2022, Allen and Nick Witters signed a licensing deal with Amazon Music to make the podcast exclusive to their platform. The three-year deal also includes first-look rights to any new content from Ballen Studios, which includes TV, film, books, and games.

References

External links 

American YouTubers
American TikTokers
American podcasters
United States Navy SEALs personnel
University of Massachusetts Amherst alumni
University of Massachusetts Amherst College of Humanities and Fine Arts alumni

Year of birth missing (living people)
Living people